Babylonian may refer to:

 Babylon, a Semitic Akkadian city/state of ancient Mesopotamia founded in 1894 BC
 Babylonia, an ancient Akkadian-speaking Semitic nation-state and cultural region based in central-southern Mesopotamia (present-day Iraq)
 Babylonian language, a dialect of the Akkadian language

See also
 Babylonia (disambiguation)
 Babylonian astronomy
 Babylonian calendar
 Babylonian captivity or Babylonian exile, a period in Jewish history
 Babylonian Jews, Jews of the area of modern-day Iraq and north Syria
 Babylonian literature
 Babylonian mathematics, also known as Assyro-Babylonian mathematics
 Babylonian religion
 First Babylonian dynasty, the first dynasty of Babylonia
 Neo-Babylonian Empire (626–539 BC)

Language and nationality disambiguation pages